The 2019 Elections for New Jersey's General Assembly  was held on November 5, 2019. All 80 seats in the Assembly were up for election. The candidates that won in November will be part of the 219th New Jersey Legislature.

All 80 seats of the New Jersey General Assembly were up for election. Democrats held a 54–26 supermajority in the lower house prior to the election. The members of the New Jersey Legislature are chosen from 40 electoral districts. Each district elects one State Senator and two State Assembly members. New Jersey uses coterminous legislative districts for both its State Senate and General Assembly.

Going into the 2019 election, every legislative district was represented by two Assembly members of the same party. This was maintained afterward, as Republicans flipped both seats in the 1st district.

Incumbents not running for re-election

Democratic
 Patricia Egan Jones, District 5

Republican
 Michael Patrick Carroll, District 25 (running for Morris County Surrogate)
 Amy Handlin, District 13
 David W. Wolfe, District 10

Overall results

Summary of results by district

Close races 
Districts where the difference of total votes between the top-two parties was under 10%:

 
 
  
 
 
  gain

List of races

Voters in each legislative district elect two members to the New Jersey General Assembly.

District 1

District 2

District 3

District 4

District 5

District 6

District 7

District 8

District 9

District 10

District 11

District 12

District 13

District 14

District 15

District 16

District 17

District 18

District 19

District 20

District 21

District 22

District 23

District 24

District 25

District 26

District 27

District 28

District 29

District 30

District 31

District 32

District 33

District 34

District 35

District 36

District 37

District 38

District 39

District 40

See also
 2019 United States elections
 2019 New Jersey elections

Notes

References

General Assembly
New Jersey General Assembly elections
New Jersey General Assembly